
Year 446 BC was a year of the pre-Julian Roman calendar. At the time, it was known as the Year of the Consulship of Barbatus and Fusus (or, less frequently, year 308 Ab urbe condita). The denomination 446 BC for this year has been used since the early medieval period, when the Anno Domini calendar era became the prevalent method in Europe for naming years.

Events
By place
Greece
 Achaea achieves its independence from Athens, while Euboea, crucial to Athenian control of the sea and food supplies, revolts against Athens. Pericles crosses over to Euboea with his troops.
 Megara joins the revolt against Athens. The strategic importance of Megara is immediately demonstrated by the appearance, for the first time in 12 years, of a Spartan army under King Pleistoanax in Attica. The threat from the Spartan army leads Pericles to arrange, by bribery and by negotiation, that Athens will give up its mainland possessions and confine itself to a largely maritime empire.
 The Spartan army retires, so Pericles crosses back to Euboea with 50 ships and 5,000 soldiers, cracking down any opposition. He punishes the landowners of Chalcis, who lose their properties, while the residents of Histiaea are uprooted and replaced by 2,000 Athenian settlers.
 After hearing that the Spartan army had accepted bribes from Pericles, Pleistoanax, the King of Sparta, is impeached by the citizens of Sparta, but flees to exile in Arcadia. His military adviser, Cleandridas also flees and is condemned to death in his absence.

 Sicily 
 Ducetius, the Hellenised leader of the Siculi, an ancient people of Sicily, returns from exile in Corinth to Sicily and colonises Cale Acte on the north coast with Greek and Siculi settlers.
 Acragas declares war on Syracuse because of the return of Ducetius and is defeated by Syracuse in the Battle of the Himera River.

 Roman Republic 
 In the Battle of Corbione, Titus Quinctius Capitolinus Barbatus leads Roman troops to a victory over the Aequi of north-east Latium and the Volsci of southern Latium.

Births 
 Aristophanes, Greek playwright (approximate year) (d. c. 385 BC)
 Marcus Furius Camillus, Roman soldier and statesman (traditional date) (d. 365 BC)

Deaths

References